is a Japanese football player.

Club statistics
Updated to end of 2018 season.

References

External links
Profile at Oita Trinita

1990 births
Living people
Fukuoka University alumni
Association football people from Ōita Prefecture
Japanese footballers
J1 League players
J2 League players
Sagan Tosu players
V-Varen Nagasaki players
Oita Trinita players
Mito HollyHock players
Association football defenders